Eucnemidae, or false click beetles, are a family of elateroid beetles including about 1700 species distributed worldwide.

Description 
Bodies are slightly flattened and convex. The upper surfaces of the body usually has hairs, setae or scales.

Ecology 
The larvae are typically legless, and generally develop feeding on the fluids of rotting wood, likely vomiting digestive enzymes into the wood to break apart the fungal hyphae, moving using their shovel shaped heads to force apart the wood. Adults, which are typically found on broken surfaces of trunks and stumps, have a short lifespan and it is unclear whether they feed, though they are capable fliers, and like some other elateroids are capable of clicking.

Taxonomy

Subfamilies 
 Anischiinae Fleutiaux, 1936
 Eucneminae Eschscholtz, 1829
 Macraulacinae Fleutiaux, 1922
 Melasinae Leach, 1817
 Palaeoxeninae Muona, 1993
 Perothopinae Lacordaire, 1857 – perothopid beetles 
 Phlegoninae Muona, 1993
 Phyllocerinae Reitter, 1905
 Pseudomeninae Muona, 1993

Fossil genera 
 †Beattieellus Oberprieler et al. 2016 – Talbragar Fossil Bed, Australia, Late Jurassic (Tithonian)
 †Cenomana Otto, 2019 – Burmese amber, Myanmar, Late Cretaceous (Cenomanian)
 †Lissantauga Poinar 2013 – Dominican amber, Miocene
 †Muonabuntor Li, Tihelka & Cai, 2020 – Burmese amber, Myanmar, Cenomanian

References 

 Biolib
 Discover Life
 J. F. Lawrence, A. M. Hastings, M. J. Dallwitz, T. A. Paine and E. J. Zurcher Elateriformia (Coleoptera) 
 "Synopsis of the Described Coleoptera of the World"
 Muona, J. 1993. Review of the phylogeny, classification and biology of the family Eucnemidae (Coleoptera). Entomologica Scandinavica, Supplement No. 44, 133 pp.

Elateroidea
Beetle families
Beetles described in 1829
Taxa named by Johann Friedrich von Eschscholtz